The Vietnamese greenfinch (Chloris monguilloti) is a small passerine bird in the family Fringillidae.
It is found only in Da Lat, Vietnam.
Its natural habitat is subtropical or tropical dry forest.
It is threatened by habitat loss.

Taxonomy
The first formal description of the Vietnamese greenfinch was by the American ornithologist Jean Théodore Delacour in 1926 under the binomial name Hypacanthis monguilloti. In the past the greenfinches were placed in the genus Carduelis but when molecular phylogenetic studies found that they were not closely related to the other species in Carduelis, they were moved to the resurrected genus Chloris. The genus had been first introduced by the French naturalist Georges Cuvier in 1800. The word Chloris is from the Ancient Greek khlōris for the European greenfinch; the specific epithet was chosen to honour Maurice Antoine François Monguillot, the General Secretary of French Indochina. The species is monotypic.

Description
It has a large conical bill, a black head and a narrow bright yellow collar. The plumage of the female is similar to that of the male but is less brightly coloured.

References

External links
 Xeno-canto: audio recordings of the Vietnamese greenfinch

Chloris (bird)
Endemic birds of Vietnam
Birds described in 1926
Taxa named by Jean Théodore Delacour
Taxonomy articles created by Polbot